Şenay Gürler (born 28 June 1966) is a Turkish actress.

She was graduated from Dokuz Eylül University in Fine Arts. She performed at the İzmir Art Theatre and worked at TRT as a presenter. After working as a dubbing artist, she began acting in films and television. She is best known for playing Fatoş in the hit comedy series Avrupa Yakası. She played in fantasy series  Acemi Cadı of turkish version "Sabrina Teenage Witch" and Küçük Sırlar Turkish version "Gossip Girl". She played in many popular series. 

Upon completion of her college, she joined the prison labour forces and volunteered as a cook. Gürler was awarded the Best Supporting Actress award at the 28th SİYAD Awards for her performance in the film Korkuyorum Anne.

Filmography

Film 
 2023 İyi Adamın 10 Günü
 2019 Söz Vermiştin
 2019 Mucize 2: Aşk (Cemile)
 2019 Söz Vermiştin (Zeliha)
 2016 Kasap Havası (film) (Leyla)
 2014 Mucize (Cemile)
 2006 Çinliler Geliyor (Ayşe)	
 2006 İlk Aşk (Kısmet)
 2005 Döngel Karhanesi (Sabahat)
 2004 Korkuyorum Anne (İpek)

TV series 
 Ayak İşler (guest appearance) (2023)
 Menajerimi Ara (Herself) (2021)
 Kalp Yarası (Azade Sancakzade) (2021–2022)
 Adım Başı Kafe (2021)
 İyi Günde Kötü Günde (Aslıhan) (2020)
 Şahsiyet (Nükhet) (2018)
 Çukur (Meliha Sancaklı) (2018–2019)
 Adı Efsane (Reyhan Yalınay) (2017)
 Kış Güneşi (Leyla Demircan) (2016)
 İçerde (Leyla Işık) (2016)
 Kaçak Gelinler (Seniha Sultan) (2014)
 Görüş Günü Kadınları (2013)
 Hayat Devam Ediyor (Cennet Zeybek) (2011–2013)
 Kolej Günlüğü (Yasemin) (2011)
 Küçük Sırlar (Şebnem) (2010–2011)
 Yeni Baştan (Elif) (2009)
 Çemberin Dışında (Kamuran) (2008)
 Acemi Cadı (Selda) (2006)
 Avrupa Yakası (Fatoş) (2004–2009)
 Şansa Bak (Neşe) (2004)
 Biz Size Aşık Olduk (Güzin) (2002)
 Ruhsar (Macide)
 Cinlerle Periler (Ümran) (2001)
 Eyvah Kızım Büyüdü (Hanım) (2000)
 İkinci Bahar (Murat's mother) (1999)
 Kaygısızlar (Cazibe) (1998)
 Kara Melek (Nesrin) (1996)
 Çılgın Bediş (Emel) (1996)
 Sahte Dünyalar (Şenay) (1995)

TV programs 
 Çeşitli Belgesel ve Programlar (TRT İzmir Television)
 Çeşitli Kültür Sanat Programları (TRT Istanbul Television)
 Sen Olsaydın (Show TV)

References

External links

1966 births
Living people
Actresses from İzmir
Turkish film actresses
Turkish stage actresses
Turkish television actresses
20th-century Turkish actresses